Igor Boyarkin (born June 13, 1995) is a Ukrainian professional basketball player for the Kanazawa Samuraiz. He represents the Ukrainian national basketball team.

Professional career

Born in Druzhkivka, Boyarkin began his basketball career in the Ukrainian Basketball SuperLeague, with the BC Donetsk from 2013 to 2014.

In September 2019, he signed with the Kharkivski Sokoly for the 2019–2020 season.

On August 20, 2022, Boyarkin signed with Kanazawa Samuraiz of Japanese B.League. On January 19, 2023, Boyarkin signed loan deal with Alvark Tokyo.

National team career
Boyarkin was a member of the Ukrainian national basketball team at the 2019 FIBA Basketball World Cup qualification.

References

1995 births
Living people
Alvark Tokyo players
BC Donetsk players
BC Kharkivski Sokoly players
BC Goverla players
BC Cherkaski Mavpy players
Kanazawa Samuraiz players
Point guards
Ukrainian men's basketball players